Detrez is a surname. Notable people with the surname include:

Conrad Detrez (1937–1985), Belgian writer
Raymond Detrez (born 1948), Belgian academic and writer
Detrez Newsome (born 1994), American football player